The Brooks House is a historic house at 704 East Market Street in Searcy, Arkansas.  It is a -story wood-frame structure, with a side-gable roof, and a slightly off-center projecting gabled section, from which an entrance vestibule projects further at its left edge.  To the left of the projecting section is a segmented-arch dormer over a group of three sash windows.  Built about 1935, it is a fine local example of a modest English Revival house, echoing more elaborate and larger-scale homes of the style in wealthier communities.

The house was listed on the National Register of Historic Places in 1992.

See also
National Register of Historic Places listings in White County, Arkansas

References

Houses on the National Register of Historic Places in Arkansas
Houses completed in 1935
Houses in Searcy, Arkansas
National Register of Historic Places in Searcy, Arkansas
1935 establishments in Arkansas
Tudor Revival architecture in Arkansas